The Stella Artois Open was a men's professional golf tournament on PGA Tour Latinoamérica played on the Fuego Maya Golf Course at La Reunion Golf Resort in Antigua, Guatemala. The tournament was first played in 2014 as one of the new events introduced as part of an expansion of PGA Tour Latinoamérica to 16 events for the 2014 season. The inaugural winner of the event was Armando Favela

Winners

Notes

References

External links
Coverage on the PGA Tour Latinoamérica official site

PGA Tour Latinoamérica events
Golf tournaments in Guatemala
Recurring sporting events established in 2014
Recurring sporting events disestablished in 2018
2014 establishments in Guatemala
2018 disestablishments in Guatemala
Antigua Guatemala